Erwin Weitzl (born 17 July 1960) is an Austrian athlete. He competed in the men's shot put at the 1984 Summer Olympics.

References

1960 births
Living people
Athletes (track and field) at the 1984 Summer Olympics
Austrian male shot putters
Olympic athletes of Austria
Place of birth missing (living people)